Adrian John Randall (born 10 November 1968) is an English former professional footballer. Randall became York City's most expensive signing when they paid £140,000 to sign the midfielder from Burnley. He was capped by the England national youth team in 1986.

References

External links

1968 births
Living people
People from Amesbury
English footballers
England youth international footballers
Association football midfielders
AFC Bournemouth players
Aldershot F.C. players
Burnley F.C. players
York City F.C. players
Bury F.C. players
Forest Green Rovers F.C. players
Newport (IOW) F.C. players
English Football League players
National League (English football) players